Daniel Alexander Reyes Buenaño (born 12 December 1987) is a Peruvian footballer who plays for Pirata F.C. in the Peruvian Segunda División as a goalkeeper.

Club career
Daniel Reyes was promoted to Alianza Lima's first team in 2007 but did not make a league appearance for them that season.

He then played in the Segunda División in 2008 with Deportivo Aviación.

Reyes then joined Alianza Atlético in January 2009. He made his debut in the Torneo Descentralizado in the 2010 season and finished his debut season with 14 appearances.

References

External links

1987 births
Living people
People from Ica Region
Association football goalkeepers
Peruvian footballers
Club Alianza Lima footballers
Alianza Atlético footballers
José Gálvez FBC footballers
Universidad Técnica de Cajamarca footballers
Unión Comercio footballers
Carlos A. Mannucci players
Los Caimanes footballers
Deportivo Coopsol players
Comerciantes Unidos footballers
Santos de Nasca players
Peruvian Primera División players
Peruvian Segunda División players